Shaqi may refer to:
 Shaqi-ye Olya
 Shaqi-ye Sofla